is a railway station in the city of Toyokawa, Aichi, Japan, operated by Meitetsu.

Lines

Station layout
The station has one side platform serving a single bi-directional track. The station has automated ticket machines, Manaca automated turnstiles and is unattended.

Adjacent stations

Station history
It was renamed to its present name on January 20, 1955.

Passenger statistics
In fiscal 2017, the station was used by an average of 2337 passengers daily.

Surrounding area
 Toyokawa City Hall

See also
 List of Railway Stations in Japan

References

External links

 Official web page 

Railway stations in Japan opened in 1945
Railway stations in Aichi Prefecture
Stations of Nagoya Railroad
Toyokawa, Aichi